Blind Chance is a Polish film written and directed by Krzysztof Kieślowski and starring Bogusław Linda. The film presents three separate storylines, told in succession, about a man running after a train and how such an ordinary incident could influence the rest of the man's life. Originally completed in 1981, Blind Chance was suppressed by the Polish authorities for several years until its delayed release in Poland on 10 January 1987 in a censored form.

The film was screened in the Un Certain Regard section at the 1987 Cannes Film Festival.
The film is among 21 digitally restored classic Polish films chosen for Martin Scorsese Presents: Masterpieces of Polish Cinema.

Plot
Witek (Bogusław Linda), sitting on an airplane, for some reason screams "No!" A bleeding person is dragged across a hospital floor. As a child, Witek learns how to write. As an adolescent, Witek dates Czuszka. As an adult, Witek goes to medical school and dates Olga (Monika Gozdzik). Witek 'loses' his calling after the death of his father. Witek decides to catch a train to Warsaw. There he crashes into a fellow drinking beer. Three different outcomes are shown, each depending on how Witek deals with the obstacles on his way to catching the train and whether or not he catches the train.

In the first scenario, Witek almost crashes into the fellow drinking the beer. He runs after the train at the Łódź Fabryczna railway station and is able to grab onto the last car's handlebar just in time to pull himself aboard. On the train he meets Werner (Tadeusz Łomnicki), an old Communist. Witek decides to join the Communist Party. On a walk with Werner, Witek meets up with Czuszka (Bogusława Pawelec), his first love. The two meet up and have sex, after which a disappointed Czuszka discovers that Witek is applying to join the party. Witek unsuccessfully tries to solve a problem with an airline mechanic. Witek breaks up a sit-in at a hospital. As a reward, a party leader plans to send Witek on a special mission to France. On a walk with Czuszka, a policeman asks them for their papers. Since Witek is a Communist, he is allowed to go on his way, while Czuszka is detained. He attempts to make up with Czuszka, who is speaking at an opposition meeting, but she rejects him. At the airport, Witek is informed that his mission to France has been cancelled.

In the second scenario, Witek slams into the fellow drinking the beer with such force that the mug slips from the drinker's hand and falls to the floor, breaking and spilling. Witek doesn't stop to apologize but still fails to catch the train. Instead he runs headlong into a railway guard on the platform, knocks him to the ground, and runs off. The guard calls for backup and Witek is arrested. A judge sentences Witek to thirty days and unpaid community service. Witek joins the anti-Communist resistance and meets up with Daniel, a friend from his childhood, and his sister Wera. He is baptised and the figure of Christ on the cross becomes a significant emblem for him.  Witek applies for a passport to go to France, but his request is denied because he is known to be an anti-Communist. The authorities offer him a passport on the condition that he discloses the underground's contacts in France. Witek goes home and begins foreplay with Wera, but is called away to the resistance's lair. The place has been ransacked and the one person left there doubts Witek's loyalty.

In the third scenario, Witek almost crashes into the fellow drinking the beer but stops in time and goes around him, apologizing. He still tries to catch the train but fails. The railway guard shows up a few seconds later but now Witek has stopped to catch his breath. He notices Olga on the platform (it's not clear if she was there in the previous two scenarios). Witek and Olga go back to his apartment where they make love on the floor. Witek decides to resume his medical studies and soon he graduates and starts practicing at the hospital as well as teaching at the medical school. Olga tells him she is three months pregnant. The two get married. Witek refuses to join the Communist Party. At the medical school, some students pass around a petition on behalf of the dean's son, who is accused of hawking illegal literature. Witek refuses to sign the petition, noting that the dean himself hasn't signed either. Witek doesn't want to get involved in politics at all. The dean offers him a trip to Libya to give some lectures on medical topics he has prepared. Witek accepts. On the train to catch the plane, Olga tells Witek she's pregnant with their second child, hoping it is a girl. At the airport, Witek sees some of the people who were more important in the previous two scenarios. The plane taxis on the runway, Witek is comfortable in his seat. The plane takes off, but a few seconds later explodes.

Cast
 Bogusław Linda as Witek
 Tadeusz Łomnicki as Werner
 Zbigniew Zapasiewicz as Adam
 Boguslawa Pawelec as Czuszka
 Marzena Trybała as Werka
 Jacek Borkowski as Marek
 Jacek Sas-Uhrynowski as Daniel
 Adam Ferency as Ksiądz
 Monika Gozdzik as Olga
 Zygmunt Hubner as Dziekan
 Irena Byrska as Ciotka
Jerzy Stuhr as ZSMP activist
Jerzy Moes as SB officer

Production
Filming locations
 Łódź Fabryczna Station, Łódź, Łódzkie, Poland 
 Łódź, Łódzkie, Poland 
 Rakowiecka, Mokotów, Warsaw, Mazowieckie, Poland 
 Warsaw, Mazowieckie, Poland

Critical response
As an example of Kieślowski's characters intersecting with history, Kickasola points out that Witek, who has the same birthdate (though not year) as Kieślowski (June 27, 1941), "ponders the irony of his 1956 birth date." In 1981, Kieślowski announced he planned to develop the realist convention as "deeper, not wider." With Blind Chance, Kieślowski "put his new philosophy partially into practice," but this film "still relies heavily on the political circumstances of Polish society to set the theme." Paul Coates describes this film "as marrying a near-psychoanalytic 'Western' preoccupation with the effects of the death of the father ... to a typically 'East European' reluctance to renounce humanism by invoking such psychoanalytic scenarios as the Oedipal one." On the review aggregator website Rotten Tomatoes, Blind Chance has an approval rating of 73% based on 11 reviews, with an average score of 7.00/10.

The filmmaker Agnieszka Holland highly praised the film in an interview for the Criterion Collection's home video release, said "Blind Chance is really one of Krzysztof's best films, perhaps even the best and the most original."

Influences 
In their interviews on the DVD (both region 1 and 2), Agnieszka Holland and film scholar Annette Insdorf identify Sliding Doors as a film influenced by Blind Chance. In both films, the outcome hinges on whether or not the protagonist catches a train, but in Sliding Doors, only two scenarios are presented (protagonist catches the train, doesn't catch it). Holland said "... a number of films just flat-out stole the concept... a mediocre film ... called Sliding Doors.... They took the concept and distorted it to where all the philosophical depth and stylistic subtlety disappeared."

Run Lola Run does not involve trains, but is similar to Blind Chance in that three scenarios are presented hinging on how the protagonist negotiates a mad dash through a crowded space. In Blind Chance the outcome of the life of the protagonist depends on how he handles the situation with the beer drinking fellow. In Run Lola Run, Lola had no choice. Her life depends on external factors. Her life changes because she is at the same place but a few seconds later, and so either gets hit by a car or can just avoid it. In Blind Chance, circumstances lead Witek to have a different character in each plot, echoed in Run Lola Run by the photographic montages shown of the people Lola passes along the way. First Witek is a communist, then a religious anticommunist, and finally he is apolitical.

Awards
 1987 Polish Film Festival Silver Lion Award: Krzysztof Kieślowski
 1987 Polish Film Festival Best Actor Award: Bogusław Linda

References

External links
 
 Blind Chance - Krzysztof Kieślowski at Culture.pl
Blind Chance: The Conditional Mood an essay by Dennis Lim at the Criterion Collection

1981 films
1980s Polish-language films
1981 drama films
Films directed by Krzysztof Kieślowski
Films scored by Wojciech Kilar
Films with screenplays by Krzysztof Kieślowski
Alternate timeline films
Polish drama films
Film controversies in Poland